Ponta do Sol (formerly: Vila Dona Maria Pia) is the northernmost city on the island of Santo Antão and Cape Verde. It is situated on the coast, 4 km northwest of Ribeira Grande and 20 km north of the island capital Porto Novo. It is the seat of Ribeira Grande municipality.

Ponta do Sol is divided into the neighbourhoods Casinhas, Cavouquinho das Tintas, Chã de Cemitério, Chã de Ponta do Sol, Lombinho, Lombo da Cruz, Lombo de Paço, Os Órgãos, Ponta do Sol and Ribeira da Ponta do Sol.

Ponta do Sol takes its name from the nearby headland Ponta do Sol, the northernmost point of Cape Verde. The former name Vila Dona María Pia refers to Maria Pia of Savoy, queen of Portugal between 1862 and 1889. Urban development of Ponta do Sol started in the 1880s; before, it was  a small fishing village. The church Nossa Senhora do Livramento was built in 1894. There is a Jewish cemetery in the town.

Historical population

Notable people
Jorge Ferreira Chaves, Portuguese architect
Raul Pires Ferreira Chaves, Portuguese worker

See also
		
Agostinho Neto Airport
List of cities and towns in Cape Verde

References

External links

Cities in Cape Verde
Ribeira Grande Municipality
Municipal seats in Cape Verde
Geography of Santo Antão, Cape Verde
Populated coastal places in Cape Verde
1584 establishments in the Portuguese Empire
Ports and harbours of Cape Verde
Populated places established in 1584